Suhana Safar is a 1970 Bollywood drama film directed by Vijay. The film stars Shashi Kapoor and Sharmila Tagore.

Plot
Sapna (Sharmila Tagore), flying back to India from the USA is involved in an airplane engine "flameout". She loves poetry, in particular the work of a poet called Ujjwala. Unable to distinguish between the poet and the poetry, she sets out on a journey to meet the poet in a place called Phulwari. Sapna believes that Ujjwala is her dream man.

Her wealthy father, worried by her distraction consults a psychiatrist who pronounces that Sapna needs treatment and must be sent to his clinic for an extended period of time. Running away from home, in a beautiful red MG TF (probably a 1954 model) she comes across Sunil (Shashi Kapoor) working on his Jeep (one of the early right-hand drive versions that Mahindras produced).

A couple of accidents later they find themselves in a luxurious Mercedes Benz tour coach (possibly an O 321 H - with a rear engine) and their journey of exploration begins. Faced with obstacles, raised by greedy people who want to get the informant's reward announced by Sapna's father Randhir Singh Chauhan; and going through some comic as well as dangerous interludes the screen couple arrive at the climax on their way to Phulwari. Sunil is doing his best to escort Sapna to Phulwari.

How Sapna reconciles her love for Ujjwala, who she has only met through his poetry and Sunil's unreciprocated love for her makes for an interesting denouement.

Cast
Shashi Kapoor as Sunil
Sharmila Tagore as Sapna
Lalita Pawar as Bus Passenger
David as Bus Passenger 
Manmohan Krishna as Bus passenger
Master Bhagwan as  Bus Passenger 
Leela Mishra as Bus Passenger 
K. N. Singh as Dr. Singh
Ramayan Tiwari as Daku Mangal Singh 
Sunder as  Bus Passenger
Randhir as Rana Randhir Singh Chauhan
Mukri as Mukkaramjah Mknaik 'Mukri'
Keshto Mukherjee as Keshto 
Mohan Sherry as Bus Driver

Soundtrack 
With Laxmikant-Pyarelal's music and Anand Bakshi's lyrics, Mohammed Rafi sang some fabulous songs for Shashi Kapoor. "Yeh Suhana Safar" & "Saari Khushiyan Hai" remained evergreen hits.

External links
 

1970 films
1970s Hindi-language films
1970 drama films
Films scored by Laxmikant–Pyarelal